Gnathophis asanoi is an eel in the family Congridae (conger/garden eels). It was described by Emma Stanislavovna Karmovskaya in 2004. It is a marine, deep water-dwelling eel which is known from the Philippines, in the western Pacific Ocean. It dwells at a depth range of 280–440 metres.

The species epithet "asanoi" refers to Hirotoshi Asano, and was given in honour of his contribution to the study of Japanese species in the family Congridae.

References

asanoi
Fish described in 2004